The Elle Style Awards are an awards ceremony hosted annually by Elle magazine.

List of award winners

2017
The 2017 edition of the Elle Style Awards took place on 13 February 2017.

 Style Influencer of the Year: Debbie Harry
 TV Actress of the Year: 
 Model of the Year: Damaris Goddrie
 H&M Conscious Award: Orsola de Castro 
 British Designer of the Year: Erdem
 Breakthrough Star of the Year: Sasha Lane
 Female Artist of the Year:  
 Fashion Director's Woman of the Year: 
 Actor of the Year: Riz Ahmed
 Accessories Designer of the Year: 
 British Brand of the Year: Christopher Bailey, Burberry
 Album of the Year: Christine and the Queens
 Actress of the Year: 
 Editor's Choice of the Year: 
 Outstanding Achievement: 
 Outstanding Contribution to Fashion: 
 Inspiring Woman of the Year: Emma Watson
 Emerging Brand Of The Year: Kym Ellery
 Fashion Director's Choice: Simon Porte Jacquemus

2016
The 2016 edition of the Elle Style Awards took place on February 23, 2016.
 Style Influencer of the Year: Jourdan Dunn
 TV Actress of the Year: Liv Tyler
 Male Model of the Year: Lucky Blue Smith
 H&M Conscious Award: Alek Wek 
 British Designer of the Year: Roksanda Ilincic
 Breakthrough Star of the Year: Suki Waterhouse
 Female Artist of the Year: Lana Del Rey 
 Fashion Director's Woman of the Year: Arizona Muse 
 Actor of the Year: Matthias Schoenaerts
 Accessories Designer of the Year: Anya Hindmarch
 British Brand of the Year: Stella McCartney
 Album of the Year: Jamie XX 
 Actress of the Year: Elizabeth Olsen 
 Editor's Choice of the Year: Clare Waight Keller
 Outstanding Achievement: Annie Lennox
 Outstanding Contribution to Fashion: Alber Elbaz
 Inspiring Woman of the Year: Karlie Kloss

2015
The 2015 edition of the Elle Style Awards took place on Tuesday, February 24, 2015.

Editor's Choice: Christopher Bailey
Emerging Designer: Ashley Williams
Musician of the Year: Sam Smith
Contemporary Brand: MARC by Marc Jacobs, Katie Hillier and Luella Bartley
Model of the Year: Rosie Huntington-Whiteley
TV Actress: Maggie Gyllenhaal 
H&M Conscious Award: Lily Cole 
Rising Star: Rebel Wilson
Accessories Designer: Stuart Vevers by Coach 
Lifetime Achievement Award: Manolo Blahnik
Actor of the Year: Luke Evans 
Breakthrough Actress: Cara Delevingne 
Red Carpet Designer: Mary Katrantzou
Film Actress: Diane Kruger 
Designer of the Year: Erdem
Outstanding Contribution to Entertainment: Simon Cowell 
Woman of the Year: Taylor Swift

2014
The 2014 edition of the Elle Style Awards took place on Tuesday, February 17, 2014.

UK Recording Artist Female: Lily Allen
British Designer of the Year: Christopher Kane
ELLE Model of the Year: Suki Waterhouse
UK Recording Artist Male: Tinie Tempah
Accessory Designer of the Year: Katie Hillier
ELLE Man of the Year: Tom Hiddleston
Red Carpet Designer of the Year: Emilia Wickstead
Contemporary Designer of the Year: Isabel Marant
Fashion Innovator: Nicola Formichetti for Diesel
International Recording Artist: Pharrell Williams
Actress of the Year: Emma Watson
Lifetime Achievement: David Bailey
ELLE Woman of the Year: Katy Perry

2013
The 2013 edition of the Elle Style Awards took place on Monday, February 11, 2013.

 International Designer of the Year: Stella McCartney
 Next Future Icon: Chloë Grace Moretz
 British Designer of the Year: Christopher Kane
 Contemporary Brand of the Year: McQ
 Jewellery Designer of the Year: Gaia Repossi
 Accessory Designer of the Year: Nicholas Kirkwood
 Red Carpet Designer of the Year: Roksanda Ilincic
 Next's New Designer of the Year: Mohinder Suresh
 Best Model: Anja Rubik
 Best Actor: Bradley Cooper
 Best Breakthrough Performance: Samantha Barks in Les Misérables
 Best TV Show: Game of Thrones
 Best Music Act: Emeli Sandé
 Editor's Choice Award: Alicia Vikander

2012
 International Designer: Sarah Burton
 British Designer: Jonathan Saunders
 Best Model: Isabeli Fontana
 Best Actress: Michelle Williams
 Best Actor: Eddie Redmayne
 Best TV-Show: Downton Abbey
 Best TV-Star: Christina Hendricks
 Best Accessory Designer: Nicholas Kirkwood
 Musician of the Year: Florence Welch
 Best Jewellery Designer: Jordan Askill
 Next Young Designer: Mary Katrantzou
 ELLE Style Icon: Rosie Huntington-Whiteley
 Next Future Icon: Jessica Chastain
 Contemporary Brand of the Year: Acne Studios

2011
Best International Designer - Tom Ford
Breakthrough Talent - Noomi Rapace
Best British Designer - Christopher Kane
Best Model - Coco Rocha
Best Actor - Stephen Dorff
Best Actress - Natalie Portman
Best TV Star - Blake Lively
Best Accessory Designer - Emma Hill
Musician Of The Year - Cheryl Cole
Best Jewellery Designer - Dominic Jones
Next Young Designer - Meadham Kirchhoff
ELLE Style Icon - Emma Watson
Outstanding Contribution to Fashion - Helena Christensen
ELLE's fashion legend - Agnetha Fältskog

2010
TV Star Of the Year - Dannii Minogue
Model Of The Year - Claudia Schiffer
Musician Of The Year - Florence And The Machine
Best Face Model - Sharmita vox
Actress Of The Year - Carey Mulligan
Actor Of The Year - Colin Firth
Breakthrough Talent - Nicholas Hoult
Style Icons of 2010 - Mary-Kate and Ashley Olsen
Woman Of The Year - Kristen Stewart
Editor's Choice - Alexa Chung

2008
Best Actor: James McAvoy
Best Actress: Keira Knightley
Best Music Act: Kate Nash
Best Music Band: The Feeling
Best Male TV: Nicholas Holt
Best Female TV: Kelly Osbourne
Best Model: Agyness Deyn
Best Accessory Designer: Pierre Hardy
British Designer of the Year: Jonathan Saunders
International Designer of the Year: Luella Bartley
Young Designer of the Year: Richard Nicoll
ELLE Style Icon: Kate Hudson
Woman of the Year: Kylie Minogue
Outstanding Achievement Award: Anya Hindmarch
H&M Style Visionary Award: William Baker

2007
Best Film: Volver
Best TV Show: Ugly Betty
Best Actor: Jude Law
Best Actress: Thandie Newton
Best Music Act: Amy Winehouse
Best British Band: Razorlight
International Designer of the Year: Stella McCartney
British Designer of the Year: Giles Deacon
Best Model: Naomi Campbell
ELLE Style Icon: Madonna
H&M Young Designer of the Year: Gareth Pugh
H&M Fashion Photographer of the Year: Gilles Bensimon

2006
Best Actor: Matt Dillon
Best Actress: Rachel Weisz
Best Male TV Star: James McAvoy
Best Female TV Star: Mischa Barton
Best Music Star: Sugababes
Levi's Hot Look: June Sarpong
Levi's Best Denim Designer: Emma Payne
Best Model: Erin O'Connor
ELLE Style Icon: Elle Macpherson
Best British Designer: Luella Bartley
Best International Designer: Roland Mouret
Woman of the Year: Charlize Theron
Outstanding Contribution to Fashion: Karl Lagerfeld

2005
Best Actor: Daniel Craig 
Best Actress: Cate Blanchett
Best Male Music Star: Will Young
Best Female Music Star: Jamelia
Best TV Star: David Walliams and Matt Lucas
Levi's Hot Look: Alison Mosshart
Levi's Hot Talent: Estelle
Best Model: Susan Eldridge
Best British Designer: Matthew Williamson
Best International Designer: Phoebe Philo
Best Young Designer: Giles Deacon
Best Individual Style: Cat Deeley
ELLE Style Icon: Helena Christensen
Woman of the Year: Cate Blanchett
Lifetime Achievement Award: Kylie Minogue

2004
Best Actor - Paul Bettany
Best Actress - Naomi Watts
Best Music Act - The Darkness
Best Female TV Star - Cat Deeley
Best Male TV Star - Nigel Harman 
Levi's Hot Look - Erin O'Connor
Best Model - Alek Wek
Best British Designer - Frost French
Best International Designer - Dolce & Gabbana
Woman of the Year - Nicole Kidman
Lifetime Achievement - Vivienne Westwood
Levi's Breakthrough Fashion Award - Jonathan Saunders
Young Designer - Alice Temperley

2002
Music Star - Sugababes
Wella Celebrity Hairstyle - Sam McKnight
Prince's Trust Fashion Enterprise Award - Damaris Evans
Artist - Sarah Doyle
Young Designer - Blaak
Wella Hot Look of the Year - Holly Valance
Female TV Star - Sally Phillips
Theatre Director - Laurence Boswell
Male TV Star - John Corbett
Writer of the Year - Scarlett Thomas
British Designer of the Year - Roland Mouret
Filmmaker of the Year - Shane Meadows
Actor - Jimi Mistry
International Designer - Marc Jacobs
Woman of the Year - Kylie Minogue
Model - Jodie Kidd
ELLE Style Icon - Stella McCartney

See also

 List of fashion awards

References

External links
 ELLE Style Awards 2011
 ELLE Style Awards Turkey

Style Awards
Fashion awards